The Laramie River is a tributary of the North Platte River, approximately  long, in the U.S. states of Colorado and Wyoming. The river was named for Jacques La Ramie, a fur trapper who visited the area in the early 19th century. Laramie County, Wyoming, the city of Laramie, and other geographical entities in the region have "Laramie" in their names.

Course
The river rises in northern Colorado, in the Roosevelt National Forest in the Front Range, in western Larimer County. The river then flows north through Laramie. In the Laramie Plains it is joined by the Little Laramie River. The Laramie River then continues north through the Laramie Plains and through Wheatland Reservoir. It flows northeast through the Laramie Mountains. It joins the North Platte opposite the town Fort Laramie.

In its upper reaches in Colorado, the river supplies water to the Cache La Poudre River via the  Laramie–Poudre Tunnel.

Discharge

See also
List of rivers of Colorado
List of rivers of Wyoming

References

External links
 

Rivers of Colorado
Rivers of Wyoming
Rivers of Larimer County, Colorado
Tributaries of the Platte River
Rivers of Albany County, Wyoming
Rivers of Platte County, Wyoming
Rivers of Goshen County, Wyoming
Tributaries of the North Platte River